Hermann Böhm (14 May 1916, in Nuremberg – 22 February 1983, in Nuremberg) was a German motorcycle racer.

1916 births
1983 deaths
German motorcycle racers
Sportspeople from Nuremberg